Lightfoot! is the debut album by Canadian singer-songwriter Gordon Lightfoot.  Although it was recorded in December 1964, the album was not released until January 1966 on the United Artists label.

At the 2017 Polaris Music Prize, the album won the public vote for the Heritage Prize in the 1960–1975 category.

Track listing
All compositions by Gordon Lightfoot, except as indicated. Catalogue Number: UAS-6487 / Mono UAL 3487

Personnel
Gordon Lightfoot - guitar, piano, vocals
David Rea - second guitar
Bruce Langhorne - second guitar ("Long River" and "Peaceful Waters")
Bill Lee - bass

Cover photography by Barry Feinstein

References

External links
Album lyrics and chords
 

Gordon Lightfoot albums
1966 debut albums
United Artists Records albums